Ahmad or Ahmed Zaki may refer to:

Ahmad Zaki Pasha (1867–1934), Egyptian philologist
Ahmed Zaki Yamani (1930–2021), former Saudi Arabian oil minister
Ahmed Zaki (politician) (1931–1996), former Prime Minister of the Republic of Maldives
Ahmad Zaki (footballer) (born 1999), Egyptian footballer
Ahmed Zaki (actor) (1949–2005), Egyptian actor
Ahmad Zakii Anwar (born 1955), Malaysian artist

See also 
Mohammad Ahmed Zaki, Indian Army General